The National Roads Telecommunications Services is the fibre-optic network of communication and control that National Highways uses to monitor England's roads. Its design has allowed active traffic management, that has led to managed motorways.

History
Prior to 2005, the motorway network was controlled by the National Motorway Communication System (NMCS). This network was not inherently fibre-optic or digitally controlled.

The £490 million contract for the NRTS was awarded to the GeneSYS Consortium on 19 September 2005. GENESYS Consortium is a group of companies led by Fluor (Fluor Corporation) and is a Public–private partnership.

The system is designed to allow a national scheme of road pricing, possibly using radio-frequency identification tags.} The cost of the project was described by the Association of British Drivers as being "an awful lot to spend just for signs saying that motorways are closed and that you should not drink and drive."

Structure
The NRTS is an intelligent transportation system based at the Quinton Business Park at Quinton, Birmingham. Video images are sent over fibre-optic cables to form a switched video network. The fibre-optic system was deployed with Guardian-Lite 3700 controllers, which uncompressed video signals and other data to be sent at the same time, made (and invented) by AMG Systems of Biggleswade. The system uses a dual fibre cable. The system is resilient because, using the IP protocol, it can re-route signals if cables are damaged provided that alternative routes remain available.

Companies
 Fluor
 Peek Traffic
 Mott MacDonald
 Alcatel-Lucent - based the system on its 1692 Metrospan Edge CWDM (coarse wavelength-division multiplexing) platform, with the 7750 Service Router, and OmniPCX enterprise voice-over-IP switch (made by the CSBU subsidiary). Alcatel-Lucent own Genesys Conferencing.

Function
It controls traffic on England's motorways and major A roads.

Customers of the NRTS
 Traffic police (Road Policing Units) and their Police Control Offices
 Traffic England - real-time website
 Traffic Radio
 TrafficMaster

See also
 Traffic Scotland
 Traffic Cops

References

External links
 NRTS
 Background
 NRTS inputs
 Peek Traffic

Video clips
 IMTech

News items
 Project cost in October 2008
 Computing April 2008

2005 establishments in the United Kingdom
Telecommunications in the United Kingdom
Intelligent transportation systems
Road transport in England
Department for Transport
Public–private partnership projects in the United Kingdom
Organisations based in Birmingham, West Midlands